USS Nirvana or USS Nirvana II may refer to more than one United States Navy ship:

 , later USS SP-706, a patrol vessel in commission in 1917 and from 1918 to 1919
 , a patrol vessel in commission from 1917 to 1918

United States Navy ship names